Song Exploder is an American biweekly music podcast originally hosted and created by Hrishikesh Hirway. Now hosted by Thao Nguyen and produced by Christian Koons, the show features musicians talking about the creative process behind an individual song while "deconstructing" the song into its component parts. The songs highlighted on the program have belonged to genres ranging from pop to hardcore punk to television theme songs, film scores and video game music. Song Exploder has explored the music of several notable artists, including Björk, Iggy Pop, MGMT, The Postal Service, Wilco, Spoon, and U2.

Song Exploder began on January 1, 2014. To date,  episodes have been released.

Episodes

2014 episodes

2015 episodes

2016 episodes

2017 episodes

2018 episodes

2019 episodes

2020 episodes

2021 episodes

2022 episodes

External links
Song Exploder Episode Guide at the podcast's official website

Song Exploder